Suhonen is a Finnish surname. Notable people with the surname include:

 Alpo Suhonen (born 1948), Finnish ice hockey coach
 Ari Suhonen (born 1965)
 Samuli Suhonen (born 1980), Finnish ice hockey player
 Mira Suhonen (born 1985), Finnish sport shooter

Finnish-language surnames